Susan Elaine Emley Keefe (born 1947) is an American anthropologist and author. She is a professor emerita at Appalachian State University. Keefe has published books on Mexican-American culture and Appalachian health issues.

Life 
Susan Elaine Emley Keefe was born in 1947 in Spokane, Washington. She attended a one-room school in Priest Lake. Her family later relocated to southern California. Keefe completed a bachelor of arts in anthropology in from University of California, Santa Barbara where she also earned a master of arts in anthropology in 1971 and a doctor of philosophy in 1974. Her dissertation was titled Women in power: Anglo and Mexican American female leaders in two Southern California communities.

In 1993, Keefe was the chair of the department of anthropology at Appalachian State University. She is a recognized scholar on Appalachian health issues. Her research includes the areas of ethnicity, modernity, culture change, social organization, and medical and applied anthropology. She has researched the Appalachian region and Mexican-Americans. Keefe is a professor emerita of anthropology at Appalachian State University. Keefe has published books on Mexican-American culture and Appalachian health issues.

Keefe has lived in Blowing Rock, North Carolina for over 30 years. She has a daughter who works in video production.

Selected works

References

External links 
 

Living people
1947 births
American women anthropologists
University of California, Santa Barbara alumni
Appalachian State University faculty
20th-century American anthropologists
21st-century American anthropologists
20th-century American women writers
21st-century American women writers
Writers from Spokane, Washington
20th-century American non-fiction writers
21st-century American non-fiction writers
American women academics
20th-century American educators
21st-century American educators
20th-century American women educators
21st-century American women educators